James Thorpe (22 June 1879 – 1956) was an English footballer who played in the Football League for Bolton Wanderers and Leeds City.

References

1879 births
1956 deaths
English footballers
Association football midfielders
English Football League players
Bolton Wanderers F.C. players
Leeds City F.C. players
Crystal Palace F.C. players
Darwen F.C. players
Rochdale A.F.C. players